Oleg Valeryevich Stogov (born 15 April 1965) is a Russian professional football coach and a former player.

Playing career
He made his debut in the Soviet First League in 1985 for FC SKA Khabarovsk. Stogov played for FC Metallurg Lipetsk in the Russian First Division and Russian Second Division from 1996 until 1998.

Honours
 Russian Premier League runner-up: 1993.
 Russian Second Division Zone West best manager: 2004.

References

1965 births
People from Vladimir, Russia
Living people
Soviet footballers
Association football midfielders
Russian footballers
PFC CSKA Moscow players
FC Fakel Voronezh players
FC Rotor Volgograd players
Russian Premier League players
FC Lokomotiv Nizhny Novgorod players
FC Sokol Saratov players
Russian football managers
FC Rotor Volgograd managers
FC Metallurg Lipetsk players
FC SKA-Khabarovsk players
FC Arsenal Tula players
Russian expatriate football managers
FK Daugava (2003) managers
Expatriate football managers in Latvia
FC Khimki managers
FC Torpedo Vladimir players
Sportspeople from Vladimir Oblast